The Josephine M. Hagerty House is a historic house at 357 Atlantic Avenue in Cohasset, Massachusetts.  Built in 1938, it was the first building in the United States commissioned from Bauhaus architect Walter Gropius, who collaborated with Marcel Breuer on its design.  It is one of the nation's early examples of International Style architecture, and was listed on the National Register of Historic Places in 1997.

Description and history
The Hagerty House is set on a point of land overlooking Massachusetts Bay on the north shore of Cohasset, west of Sandy Beach.  The house is set near the rocky coastline, on a foundation made of locally gathered fieldstone.  Parts of the house are supported by lally columns.  The house is an L-shaped structure, with a horizontal (roughly north–south) single-story section and a three-story section extending west (inland) below its left end.  The exterior is finished in vertical board siding, interspersed with floor-to-ceiling plate glass windows, and bands of windows set to maximize ocean views.  A sundeck projects further to the south.  The building has undergone a number of minor alterations, primarily in response to the harsh conditions imposed on the original materials used.  Windows have been replaced, retaining the basic plan and intent, and stone used in the chimneys, foundations, and retaining walls has been repointed using salt-resistant cement.

The house was built in 1938, and was the first commissioned design of Walter Gropius in the United States (his first US design was his own house in Lincoln, Massachusetts).  It was commissioned by John Hagerty, a student of his at the Harvard Graduate School of Design, as a home for his mother, and was completed in collaboration with Marcel Breuer.  Like his own house, Gropius emphasized simple lines and the use of native materials (wood and local stone) in its construction.

See also
National Register of Historic Places listings in Norfolk County, Massachusetts

References

Walter Gropius buildings
Houses completed in 1938
Houses in Norfolk County, Massachusetts
Houses on the National Register of Historic Places in Norfolk County, Massachusetts
International style architecture in Massachusetts